The 1948 All-Ireland Minor Hurling Championship was the 18th staging of the All-Ireland Minor Hurling Championship since its establishment by the Gaelic Athletic Association in 1928.

Tipperary entered the championship as the defending champions, however, they were beaten by Waterford in the Munster final.

On 5 September 1948 Waterford won the championship following a 3-8 to 4-2 defeat of Kilkenny in the All-Ireland final. This was their second All-Ireland title and their first in 16 championship seasons.

Results

All-Ireland Minor Hurling Championship

Semi-finals

Final

Championship statistics

Miscellaneous

 The All-Ireland final between Waterford and Kilkenny was the first ever championship meeting between the two teams.
 Waterford became the fifth team to win more than one All-Ireland Championship title.

External links
 All-Ireland Minor Hurling Championship: Roll Of Honour

Minor
All-Ireland Minor Hurling Championship